Graham Ronald Collier (born 12 September 1951) is an English former professional footballer who played as a midfielder in the Football League for Nottingham Forest, Scunthorpe United, Barnsley and York City, and in non-League football for Buxton. He took over as assistant manager of Ilkeston Town in June 1994.

References

1951 births
Living people
Footballers from Nottingham
English footballers
Association football midfielders
Nottingham Forest F.C. players
Scunthorpe United F.C. players
Barnsley F.C. players
Buxton F.C. players
York City F.C. players
English Football League players